Sedoreovirinae (sedo = smooth) is a subfamily of the Reoviridae family of viruses. Viruses in this subfamily are distinguished by the absence of a turreted protein on the inner capsid to produce a smooth surface.

Characteristics
Like other members of the Reoviridae family, viruses of the Sedoreovirinae subfamily are made of naked, icosahedral capsids containing 10-12 segments of linear double-stranded RNA (dsRNA). The Baltimore System of viral classification categorizes Reoviridae in Group III.

Importance
Viruses classified in the Sedoreovirinae subfamily infect a wide range of plants and animals, including some that can infect humans. There is not only the potential of a few of these viruses to cause human disease, but also to reduce the supply of crops and livestock.

Viruses

Genus Cardoreovirus
Eriocheir sinensis reovirus was isolated out of a Chinese mitten crab (Eriocheir sinensis). No currently known associated disease.

Genus Mimoreovirus
Microsomonas pusilla reovirus was isolated from the marine protist Micromonas pusilla

Genus Orbivirus
Arboviruses containing dsRNA are placed in this genus. Some Orbivirus infect livestock with high rates of morbidity and mortality. 
Includes: Bluetongue virus, African horse sickness virus, Epizootic hemorrhagic disease virus, among others.

Genus Phytoreovirus
Known phytoreoviruses are plant pathogens causing dwarfism and the formation of tumors. 
Included: Rice dwarf virus, Rice gall dwarf virus, and Wound tumor virus.

Genus Rotavirus
Rotavirus A-E cause infantile gastroenteritis in humans and farm animals.

Genus Seadornavirus
Many known Seadornaviruses cause encephalitis in humans.
Included: Banna virus, Kadipiro virus, and Liao ning virus.

References

 
Reoviruses
Virus subfamilies